Santena is a  (municipality) in the Metropolitan City of Turin in the Italian region Piedmont, located about  southeast of Turin on the right bank of the Po.

The  of Gamenario is known for the Battle of Gamenario, fought on 22 April 1345 between the Guelphs and Ghibellines. Sights include the castle, built by Carlo Ottavio Benso in 1712–20. It houses furnitures and memories of the families who lived there, including a vase donated by Napoleon III of France to Camillo Benso, Conte di Cavour in 1856. Nearby is a  English landscape garden built under Cavour's father, Michele Giuseppe Francesco Antonio Benso, 4th Marquess of Cavour (1781-1850), in the early 18th century.

Santena borders the following municipalities: Chieri, Cambiano, Trofarello, Poirino, and Villastellone.

Heritage and culture

Sister cities 
Since 2015, Santena is joined as a sister city with the following cities:

  Plombières-les-Bains, commune of France located in the Vosges department in the region Grand Est.

References

External links
 Official website